KeyBank Tower is a skyscraper in Dayton, Ohio. Its address at 10 West 2nd Street was the first official name of the structure. The building was once named MeadWestvaco Tower until KeyBank gained naming rights to the tower in 2008. KeyBank occupies about 45,000 square feet of office space spread across four floors of the tower. The main office branch was previously located on the first floor of the tower until it closed in May 2021. Other tenants include National Processing Solutions, Scientific Simulations Systems, Skilken & Skilken, Colliers International, and the Downtown Dayton Partnership.

The first floor of the KeyBank Tower also houses an OinkADoodleMoo BBQ restaurant.

In 2010, a group of Cincinnati investors purchased KeyBank Tower. The  building was purchased from THMG 10 West Second Street LLC, a real estate investment company. The company is taking approaches to have the entire office tower leased.

References

See also
List of tallest buildings in Dayton, Ohio

Skyscraper office buildings in Dayton, Ohio

Office buildings completed in 1976